Suksunsky District is an administrative district (raion) of Perm Krai, Russia; one of the thirty-three in the krai. Municipally, it is incorporated as Suksunsky Municipal District. It is located in the southeast of the krai. Its administrative center is the urban locality (a work settlement) of Suksun. Population:  The population of Suksun accounts for 39.9% of the district's total population.

History
The district was established on February 27, 1924, but was abolished between 1932 and 1935 and then again between 1963 and 1964.

Demographics
Ethnic composition (as of the 2002 Census):
Russians: 83.4%
Tatars: 8%
Mari people: 6.9%

References

Notes

Sources

Districts of Perm Krai
States and territories established in 1924
States and territories disestablished in 1932
States and territories established in 1935
States and territories disestablished in 1963
States and territories established in 1964
1924 establishments in the Soviet Union